Odle may refer to:

 Odle (app), a social translation-based mobile app
 Odle Middle School, a public middle school in Bellevue, Washington, United States
 Alan Odle (1888–1948), English illustrator
 Robert Odle (1944–2019), American lawyer
 Odle, a group of mountains in the Dolomites, Italy